Brustad is a surname. Notable people with the surname include:

Arne Brustad (1912–1987), Norwegian footballer
Bjarne Brustad (1895–1978), Norwegian composer, violinist and violist
Eline Gleditsch Brustad (born 1994), Norwegian racing cyclist
Fredrik Brustad (born 1989), Norwegian footballer
Georg Brustad (1892–1932), Norwegian gymnast
Karsten Brustad (born 1959), Norwegian contemporary composer and guitarist
Knut Brustad (born 1945), Norwegian middle-distance runner
Sylvia Brustad (born 1966), Norwegian politician